The Buckeye Sun is the community newspaper of Buckeye, Arizona and of the larger Southwest Valley region of the Phoenix Metropolitan Area.  It is published weekly on Wednesdays and was formerly titled the Southwest Valley Sun.

According to the Library of Congress, the newspaper began in 1938 by publisher R.H. Vermilion.

The Buckeye Sun was started by the editor of the Buckeye Valley News and split off from this paper to establish the "Buckeye Independent".

References

External links
Buckeye Sun

Newspapers published in Arizona